The Canary Wharf Squash Classic 2016 is the 2016 edition of the Canary Wharf Squash Classic, which is a tournament of the PSA World Tour event International (Prize money : 70 000 $). The event took place at the East Wintergarden in London in England from 7 March to 11 March. Mathieu Castagnet won his first Canary Wharf Squash Classic trophy, beating Omar Mosaad in the final.

Prize money and ranking points
For 2016, the prize purse was $70,000. The prize money and points breakdown is as follows:

Seeds

Draw and results

See also
2016 PSA World Tour
Canary Wharf Squash Classic
2016 Men's British Open

References

External links
PSA Canary Wharf Squash Classic 2016 website
Canary Wharf Squash Classic 2016 official website

Canary Wharf
Canary Wharf Squash Classic
Canary Wharf Squash Classic
Canary Wharf Squash Classic
Canary Wharf Squash Classic
Squash competitions in London